Le Bois-Robert is a commune in the Seine-Maritime department in the Normandy region in north-western France.

Geography

Population

Places of interest
 The two châteaux dating from the eighteenth century.
 The church of Notre-Dame, dating from the eleventh century.

See also
Communes of the Seine-Maritime department

References

External links

 Website of the commune of Bois-Robert 

Communes of Seine-Maritime